Bahati Ali Abeid (born May 22, 1967) is a Member of Parliament in the National Assembly of Tanzania. She is a member of the ruling Chama Cha Mapinduzi party and was its UWT Regional Secretary from 2002–2003. From 1995–2000 she was the Ward Secretary for the Organization of Women in Tanzania.

References

1967 births
Living people
Chama Cha Mapinduzi politicians
Members of the National Assembly (Tanzania)
21st-century Tanzanian women politicians